The Autovía A-60 is a proposed highway in Central Spain between Valladolid and Leon.  It will be an upgrade of the N-601.

References 

A-60
A-60